BharatMatrimony is an online matrimony service and a part of Matrimony.com. It was founded in 2000 by Murugavel Janakiraman, who later met his wife through his own matrimony site. The company has 130 offices in India, with  offices in Dubai, Sri Lanka, United States and Malaysia to cater to customers beyond India.

History
Murugavel Janakiraman started the BharatMatrimony website in 2000 while working as a software consultant for Lucent Technologies in Edison, N.J. In the late 1990s he set up a Tamil community web portal, which included matrimonial ads. He started BharatMatrimony after noticing the matrimonial ads generated most of his web traffic. He returned to India in 2004.

Back in the early 2000s, when there was skepticism about online matrimony and fear about paying online, the company pioneered doorstep collections in India. The company introduced features on their website like Matchboard, SoulMate Search, AstroMatch, and Express Interest to help customers make the right matches.

BharatMatrimony has mobile apps for iPhone, iPad, BlackBerry, Nokia and Android users in India. It also has an upgraded WAP site.

Anand Bhushan was hired by BharatMatrimony on a retainer basis.

Assisted Matrimony is a personalized match making service offered for busy professionals.

In 2006, the website earned into the Limca Book of World Records for having facilitated the highest number of documented marriages online in India, a number that has since reached one million marriages.

In 2009, BharatMatrimony launched more than 200 community portals, aimed at specific language groups and communities. The company launched more portals in 2010 aimed at Malaysian and Singaporean Tamils. BharatMatrimony operated in more than 14 regional languages. Another portal was aimed at defence personnel.

In 2014, BharatMatrimony entered into talks with several telecom companies in order to launch its Interactive Voice Response (IVR) matrimony service. BharatMatrimony users would use the IVR service to send and receive voice messages from prospective matches on their mobile devices.

Assisted Matrimony 
Assisted Matrimony is a personalized match making service, from BharatMatrimony, offered for busy Indian professionals who need assistance in finding a match. There is no data base that users can search. Trained relationship managers understand member preferences, search for matching profiles and send them to members. They then contact prospects and facilitate meetings on mutual consent of prospective families.
This is one of the cheating website and no service provided after a huge sum is paid. Don't join this site as you will lose your money.
BharatMatrimony started the personal assisted service in 2008 with the launch of BM Privilege. This was then renamed Privilege Matrimony in 2009.

Awards
Red Herring Global 100 Award, 2010
Technology Fast 50, Deloitte Technology, 2008
Best India Portal, PC World, 2007

See also 
 Matrimony.com
 Elite Matrimony
 Jeevansathi.com
 Shaadi.com

References 

Indian matrimonial websites